William Leader Maberly (1798–1885) spent most of his life as a British army officer and Whig politician.

Life
He was the eldest child of John Maberly (1777–1845), a currier, clothing manufacturer, banker and MP, who had made and lost a fortune in a lifetime.

He became a member of parliament, initially for Westbury (1819–20), then Northampton (1820–30), then Shaftesbury (1831–32), and finally for Chatham (1832–34).

In 1831 he was Surveyor-General of the Ordnance and in 1832 Clerk of the Ordnance; then, in 1834, he became a Commissioner of HM Customs. In 1836, he was appointed as joint secretary to the General Post Office, where he strongly opposed the introduction of the Penny Post, a plan championed by Rowland Hill to charge a fixed price for postage (as is now the normal practice in most of the world). One of Maberly's principal secretaries during his time at the Post Office was the novelist Anthony Trollope, who later parodied Maberly as Sir Boreas Bodkin in the novel Marion Fay. On stepping down from the Post Office in 1854 he was appointed a Commissioner of Audit, remaining in post until 1867.

In 1865, the Canadian Post Office Department Secretary William Dawson LeSueur named the settlement of Maberly, Ontario in Maberly's honour.

Marriage
He married Irish novelist Catherine C. Prittie (1805–75) in 1830. Their only child, William Anson Robert Maberly, died at the age of 29 in the Isle of Wight.

References

External links
 Dictionary of National Biography
 The naming of Maberly, Ontario

External links
 

1798 births
1885 deaths
Whig (British political party) MPs for English constituencies
Members of the Parliament of the United Kingdom for English constituencies
UK MPs 1818–1820
UK MPs 1820–1826
UK MPs 1826–1830
UK MPs 1831–1832
UK MPs 1832–1835
British Army officers